St Mary's Church is in the village of Chartham, Kent, England.  It is an active Anglican parish church in the diocese of Canterbury.  Constructed between 1285 and circa 1305, with a later tower of the fourteenth century. In 1875, the church was restored by George Edmund Street. St Marys is designated by English Heritage as a Grade I listed building.

History
An archaeological survey undertaken in 2010–11, found evidence of Romano-British and Anglo-Saxon habitation. The present church dates from the late 13th century, with a traditional construction date of 1285. A patent roll dating from the reign of Edward I records the partial remittance of a fine levied on the rector, "towards the works of his church begun by him". The architectural historian John Newman notes that there is strong stylistic evidence to suggest the involvement of Michael of Canterbury, the master mason at Canterbury Cathedral. The tower is later, of the fourteenth century. 

The church was restored between 1873 and 1875 by George Edmund Street. It is designated by English Heritage as a Grade I listed building.

In 2018, the Commissary General of the Diocese of Canterbury delivered a significant judgement on the installation of closed-circuit television at St Marys. Allowing the application, the Commissary sought to balance public-access requirements, for which CCTV was necessary on security grounds, and the privacy expectations of parishioners.  The church remains an active parish church with regular services.

Architecture and description
 
The church is constructed of Kentish knapped flint with ragstone quoins.  It is of cruciform design, with nave, transepts, chancel and tower. The church has a number of features of particular note.  The nave, transepts and crossing have "a magnificent series of c. 1300 timber roofs with large scissor-trussed rafters."  The windows in the chancel are considered amongst the very best examples of Kentish tracery. The stained glass, although "much renewed in 1881 (has) enough glass of c.1294 to guarantee the authenticity of the whole". The brass of the medieval knight, Sir Robert de Septvans, is the one of the oldest in the country and "none are more memorable". The church also contains monuments by Rysbrack and Thomas Scheemakers.

References

Bibliography
 

Church of England church buildings in Kent
Chartham
1285 in Christianity